Billy Woods (stylized as billy woods) is an American rapper based in New York. He is also the founder of the record label Backwoodz Studioz. Woods has been a member of Armand Hammer, Super Chron Flight Brothers, and The Reavers.

Early life
Billy Woods was born in Washington, D.C. His mother was an English literature professor from Jamaica. His father was a PhD Marxist writer, active in the Zimbabwe War of Liberation and then member of the government in Zimbabwe. In 1980, the family moved to Zimbabwe. After the death of Woods' father, they returned to the United States in 1989. Woods briefly attended Howard University before getting involved in New York City's hip hop scene. He started making music in the late 1990s. He wrote his "first real rhyme" at a laundromat in Kennebunk, Maine in 1997.

Career
Billy Woods released his debut solo album, Camouflage, on his record label Backwoodz Studioz in 2003. In 2012, he released History Will Absolve Me. In 2013, he released Dour Candy, which was entirely produced by Blockhead. In 2017, he released Known Unknowns. It was included on Rolling Stones "15 Great Albums You Probably Didn't Hear in 2017" list. In 2019, he released a collaborative album with producer Kenny Segal, titled Hiding Places, as well as a solo album, Terror Management. 2020 brought Brass, a collaborative album with Moor Mother. Woods released Aethiopes and Church in 2022.

Discography

Studio albums
 Camouflage (2003)
 The Chalice (2004)
 Terror Firma (2005) 
 Emergency Powers: The World Tour (2007) 
 Indonesia (2009) 
 Cape Verde (2010) 
 History Will Absolve Me (2012)
 Dour Candy (2013)
 Today, I Wrote Nothing (2015)
 Known Unknowns (2017)
 Hiding Places (2019) 
 Terror Management (2019)
 Brass (2020)  
 Aethiopes (2022)
 Church (2022)

Compilation albums
 Cowardly Threats & Hideous Cruelty (2011)

Mixtapes
 New York Times (2006) 
 Deleted Scenes (2009)

Singles
 "Slums / America / Dusted" (2005) 
 "Shadows" (2006) 
 "Dirtweed" (2007)

Guest appearances
 Invizzibl Men - "52 Lashings" from The Unveiling (2008)
 Vordul Mega - "Opium Scripts", "Air Battery", "Keep Livin'" and "Imani" from Megagraphitti (2008)
 Teleseen - "Chikurubi" and "Whiteworst" from Fear of the Forest (2009)
 A.M. Breakups - "Forms" and "Chapter 2" from The Cant Resurrection (2011)
 Cult Favorite - "Omega3" from For Madmen Only (2013)
 L'Orange - "The End" from The Orchid Days (2014)
 L'Orange - "Stop Growing" from After the Flowers (2015)
 Pawcut - "Vulture's Picnic" from Maverick (2015)
 ELUCID - "Who No Know Gon Know" and "Slumped" from Osage (2016)
 ELUCID - "Bleachwater" and "Lest They Forget" from Save Yourself (2016)
 Lushlife - "The Heart Is an Atomic Bomb" from My Idols Are Dead + My Enemies Are in Power (2017)
 Uncommon Nasa - "Written at Night" from Written at Night (2017)
 Mach-Hommy - "383 Myrtle" from Dumpmeister (2017)
 Henry Canyons - "It Don't Mean a Thing" from Cool Side of the Pillow (2018)
 Curly Castro - "Ital-You-Can-Eat" from Tosh (2018)
 Blockhead - "Slippery Slope" from Free Sweatpants (2019)
 L'Orange & Jeremiah Jae - "Clay Pigeons" from Complicate Your Life with Violence (2019)
 Nicholas Craven - "Gyre" from Craven N 2 (2019)
 Shrapknel - "Estranged Fruit" from Shrapknel (2020)
 Quelle Chris & Chris Keys - "Grease from the Elbows" from Innocent Country 2 (2020)
 Preservation - "Lemon Rinds" and "Snow Globe" from Eastern Medicine, Western Illness (2020)
 FIELDED - "Justus" from Demisexual Lovelace (2020)
 Small Bills - "Sometimes Care Looks Like Leave Me the Fuck Alone" from Don't Play it Straight (2020)
 Your Old Droog - "Odessa" from Dump YOD: Krutoy Edition (2020)
 Navy Blue - "Poderoso" from Songs of Sage: Post Panic! (2020)
 YOUNGMAN & Celestaphone - "Human Rights" from A Year of Octobers (2021)
 Curly Castro - "Killmonger Was Right" from Little Robert Hutton (2021)
 Steel Tipped Dove - "Kingston", "Nft", "Buddy Ryan", and "Simple Machines" from Call Me When You're Outside (2021)
 Your Old Droog & Lil Ugly Mane - "Meteor Man" from Space Bar (2021)
 PremRock - "Bardo" from Load Bearing Crow's Feet (2022)
 ELUCID - "Sardonyx", "Nostrand", "Mangosteen", and "Jumanji" from I Told Bessie (2022)
 Myles Bullen - "Ordinary Magic" from "Mourning Travels" (2022)
 Algiers - "Bite Back" (2022)
 Jeff Markey - "Floaters" from Sports and Leisure (2022)
 Skech185 & Jeff Markey - "Western Automatic Music, Pt. 2" from He Left Nothing for the Swim Back (2023)

References

External links
 BackwoodzStudioz.com
 

Living people
Year of birth missing (living people)
American rappers of Jamaican descent
American people of Zimbabwean descent
American male rappers
Rappers from New York City
Underground rappers
Indie rappers
21st-century American rappers
21st-century American male musicians